Eucosmophora ingae is a moth of the family Gracillariidae. It is known from Costa Rica.

The length of the forewings is 3.1-3.6 mm for males and 3.1-3.4 mm for females.

The larvae feed on Inga oerstediana and Pithecollobium catenatum. They mine the leaves of their host plant. On Inga oerstediana, the early mine is serpentine, glassy, and winds about the lamina. Later, it is abruptly enlarged into an irregular blotch. The upper surface of the mine is nearly translucent, the larvae being visible within the mine through their development. Frequently two to five or more mines may anastamose into a single large blotch. The larva exits through a hemispherical slit in the upper leaf surface. The cocoon is orange-brown.

Etymology
The species name is derived from the generic name, Inga, of the larval host plant.

References

Acrocercopinae
Moths described in 2005